Paul A. Ajlouny is a Palestinian-American publisher and businessman known for launching the now-defunct Palestinian newspaper Al-fajr in 1972 in Jerusalem, and for his extensive work in the field of Palestinian development in both the United States and the Middle East.

Ajlouny was born in Ramallah, Palestine in 1933, but immigrated to the United States in 1946. He earned a degree in Engineering from the University of Kentucky in 1963. He is a United States Navy veteran.

In the 1950s, Ajlouny help found the American Federation of Ramallah, Palestine, an organization for Palestinian-Americans from the Ramallah region living in the United States, with chapters across the country.

While studying in Kentucky in the 1960s, Ajlouny and his brother-in-law Yusuf Nasr decided to launch an Arabic-language newspaper back home in Palestine.  After graduating, Ajlouny and Nasr returned to Palestine to establish Al-fajr. However, Nasr was soon kidnapped from his apartment in East Jerusalem under suspicious circumstances, and was never found. Ajlouny subsequently took over as publisher of the paper, and oversaw its official launch as the first edition hit newsstands in Jerusalem and Israel in 1972. (Distribution of Al-fajr in the Israeli occupied territories of the West Bank and Gaza Strip was forbidden by the Israeli authorities.)

Ajlouny was the Head of International Service for Westinghouse and Worthington. He traveled the world establishing, preparing and repairing units. After working for Westinghouse, he established a maintenance company for the operation and maintenance of high rise buildings worldwide, the most famous of which were the World Trade Centers in New York City.

In New York, he established Ramallah Properties Group, which facilitates the ownership interest for Palestinians that own properties in Palestine. 

In 1978, Ajlouny founded the United Palestinian Appeal in order to help needy Palestinians and facilitate cultural and economic growth in Palestine. The organization has provided emergency relief and launched long-term development projects in the West Bank, Gaza Strip, and Palestinian refugee camps in Lebanon.

He currently resides in California.

References

External links
Profile of Paul Ajlouny at the Institute for Middle East Understanding .
Personality: Paul A. Ajloluny, The Washington Report on Middle East Affairs, 24 February 1986
Justia.com

1933 births
20th-century American businesspeople
American people of Palestinian descent
Living people
Mass media in the State of Palestine
United States Navy sailors
University of Kentucky alumni